Mykola Kukharevych (born 1 July 2001) is a  Ukrainian professional footballer who plays as a forward for Scottish Premiership club Hibernian, on loan from French club Troyes.

Career
Born in Dubrovytsia Raion, Kukharevych is a product of the Volyn Lutsk sportive school system.

He was promoted to the Ukrainian Premier League along with his team Rukh Lviv and made his debut in the Ukrainian Premier League for Rukh on 23 August 2020, playing as the start-squad player in a losing away match against FC Vorskla Poltava.

Following the weeks of rumors on 17 December 2020 Hryhoriy Kozlovskyi, the president of Rukh Lviv confirmed the preliminarily agreement for Kukharevych transfer to Anderlecht, that should be announced officially in January 2021 with the opening of winter transfer window. The transfer was not finalized, instead in on 26 March Rukh Lviv made an announcement of the deal on Kukharevych transfer to Troyes AC on 1 July 2021.

In September 2022, Kukharevych joined Scottish Premiership side Hibernian on loan until the end of the season. Kukharevych scored his first Hibernian goal in a 2–1 home defeat against St Johnstone on 21 October. He missed a few months of playing time due to a medial ligament injury, returning to action in early March with a goal in a 4–1 win against Livingston.

References

External links 
Statistics at UAF website (Ukr)

2001 births
Living people
Ukrainian footballers
Ukrainian expatriate footballers
FC Volyn Lutsk players
FC Rukh Lviv players
ES Troyes AC players
Oud-Heverlee Leuven players
Ukrainian Premier League players
Ukrainian First League players
Ligue 1 players
Belgian Pro League players
Ukraine under-21 international footballers
Association football forwards
Expatriate footballers in France
Expatriate footballers in Belgium
Ukrainian expatriate sportspeople in France
Ukrainian expatriate sportspeople in Belgium
Sportspeople from Rivne Oblast
Challenger Pro League players
Expatriate footballers in Scotland
Ukrainian expatriate sportspeople in Scotland
Hibernian F.C. players
Scottish Professional Football League players